Fritz Semmelmann (24 July 1928 – 17 June 2011) was a German footballer. He competed in the men's tournament at the 1956 Summer Olympics.

References

External links
 

1928 births
2011 deaths
German footballers
Olympic footballers of the United Team of Germany
Footballers at the 1956 Summer Olympics
Sportspeople from Bayreuth
Association football midfielders
SpVgg Bayreuth players
Footballers from Bavaria